Wilmer Daniel Ramos Rodríguez (born June 1, 1979 Saba, Honduras) is a Honduran professional footballer.

Club career
Nicknamed el Cambio, Ramos was part of the Victoria squad that suffered relegation after the 2002-2003 season. He played in Guatemala, where he left Sacachispas in summer 2007 after failing to score a goal in 10 games and joined Zacapa.

In 2008, he joined Deportes Savio. In January 2010 he crossed the border to play for Salvadoran side Municipal Limeño. He scored 18 Honduran league goals in total.

References

External links

1979 births
Living people
People from Colón Department (Honduras)
Association football defenders
Honduran footballers
Honduras international footballers
C.D. Victoria players
Atlético Olanchano players
C.D. Olimpia players
Deportivo Zacapa players
Deportes Savio players
Liga Nacional de Fútbol Profesional de Honduras players
Honduran expatriate footballers
Expatriate footballers in Guatemala
Expatriate footballers in El Salvador